Holanna Creek is a stream in the U.S. state of Georgia. It is a tributary to Pataula Creek.

"Holanna" is a name derived from Muskogean language meaning "yellow potato". Alternative spellings are "Holana Creek" and "Holanee Creek".

References

Rivers of Georgia (U.S. state)
Rivers of Quitman County, Georgia
Rivers of Randolph County, Georgia